Operation Munja 93 was one of the most successful operations from the Army of the Republic of Bosnia executed by the 505th Buzim brigade where they liberated a considerable area of state territory in the area of Banjan.

Background 
The Operation was planned in great secrecy in October 1992. 360 fighters from the 505th Buzim Brigade were engaged for this operation and they were divide into six groups. The same number of fighters were engaged without weapons, behind the first combat groups, and their task was to evacuate the wounded and killed in battle and to pass the weapons of the dead and wounded and possibly captured barrels to the fighters without weapons. On the Serbian side there was one battalion of the 1st Novigrad Light Brigade, who did not suffer from the same lack of weapons as the Bosnians and were well armed.

The Operation 
The main attack was directed on Banjan and Dobro Selo and the operation was started on 11 January with attacks on Serb bunkers and the start of this battle was also marked by the war cry "Takbir - Allahu Akbar". In just two hours of fighting the heaviest defeat up to that time was inflicted on the 1st Krajina Corps of the VRS. The operation was mostly completed by ten o'clock, when the fighters took control of most of the planned positions, except for the Banjan school, which was captured two days later. In the following days, the VRS counter attacked using elite troops but were repelled and failed to retake any ground.

Aftermath 
In the operation 40 km2 of land was liberated by the 505th Buzim Brigade. 18 soldiers of the 505th Buzim Brigade died and 8 of them died and on the first day of the operation, on the Serbian side there were 163 dead soldiers and several hundred wounded. This operation gave the 505th Bužim Brigade a recognizable image, because they successfully carried out the operation and inflicted significant losses on the enemy despite being heavily outgunned.

References 

Battles of the Bosnian War